Louis-Auguste Lapito (born Joinville-le-Pont, August 18, 1803 - died Boulogne-sur-Seine, April 7, 1874) was a French painter.  He exhibited at many Paris Salons.  He was named a Chevalier of the Légion d'honneur in 1836, and a Chevalier of the Order of Leopold as well.

References
 Émile Bellier de La Chavignerie, Louis Auvray, Dictionnaire général des artistes de l'École française depuis l'origine des arts du dessin jusqu'à nos jours : architectes, peintres, sculpteurs, graveurs et lithographes, Tome 1, pp. 907–908, Librairie Renouard, Paris, 1882  Gallica
 Pierre Claude Giansily, Histoire de la peinture en Corse au XIXème siècle et XIXème siècle et dictionnaire des peintres, Colonna édition, 2010; p. 440 Extraits

19th-century French painters
French male painters
Chevaliers of the Légion d'honneur
People from Val-de-Marne
1803 births
1874 deaths
19th-century French male artists